Nevadopalpa striata is a moth in the family Gelechiidae. It was described by Povolný in 1998. It is found in North America, where it has been recorded from California.

References

Nevadopalpa
Moths described in 1998